Stadionul Extensiv is a multi-use stadium in Craiova, Romania.  It is used mostly for football matches and it is the home ground of CS Universitatea II Craiova. The stadium holds 7,000 people. The stadium was the home ground of Extensiv Craiova. In 2005 when Extensiv Craiova dissolved, the stadium was abandoned: chairs were broken, but it was saved by Craiova's old boys' team.

References

Football venues in Romania
Buildings and structures in Craiova
Buildings and structures in Dolj County
Sport in Craiova
CS Universitatea Craiova